The New Zealand standard for school stationery (known formally as NZS 8132:1984 - Specification for school stationery) was established in 1984 by the 'Standards Association Ltd', New Zealand's national standards body. It specifies various types of stationery to ensure that different manufacturers produce compatible products of suitable quality. Standardisation enables schools and businesses to request or order appropriate stationery without regard for brand.

The original specifications were devised after consultation with the Department of Education and various teachers' organisations. Products are defined by codes, according to their size, binding and format.

This document has been withdrawn without replacement.

Part Index Code 
 Number for PRODUCT GROUP  1 – 21
 Letter for INNER FORMAT  A – Z
 Number for FINISHED SIZE  1 – 10

Product Groups

Inner Format

Finished Size of Book

References
 Code details were sourced from information supplied by Croxley Stationery Ltd of New Zealand.

External links 
 School Stationery

Stationery
Education in New Zealand
Standards of New Zealand